Sir Oliver Robbins  (born 20 April 1975) is a former senior British civil servant who served as the Prime Minister's Europe Adviser and the chief Brexit negotiator from 2017 to 2019. He was a controversial figure among Brexit supporters. He previously served as the Permanent Secretary at the Department for Exiting the European Union from July 2016 to September 2017, and as the Prime Minister's Advisor on Europe and Global Issues from June 2016 to July 2016. Since 2019, he has been an investment advisor at Goldman Sachs.

Before his roles relating to the European Union, Robbins had served as Principal Private Secretary to the Prime Minister and Second Permanent Secretary for the Home Office.

Early life and education 
Robbins was born on 20 April 1975 in Lambeth to Derek and Diana Robbins. His father, Derek Robbins, is Emeritus Professor of international social theory at the University of East London, where he has taught since it was founded as North-East London Polytechnic in 1970, devoting his career to French post-structuralist social theory and the work of Pierre Bourdieu. His mother was a civil servant, who later left her job to raise her children. He was educated at Colfe's School, a private school in Lee, London.

He studied Philosophy, Politics and Economics (PPE) at Hertford College, Oxford. He graduated from the University of Oxford with a Bachelor of Arts (BA) degree in 1996. At Oxford, Robbins was president of the Oxford Reform Club, a group promoting a federal European Union. He was nicknamed "Sir Humphrey" after the Yes Minister permanent secretary character Sir Humphrey Appleby.

Career

Early career 
Robbins joined HM Treasury in 1996 after graduating, serving as Head of Corporate and Private Finance from 2003 to 2006, and then briefly as Head of Defence, Diplomacy and Intelligence finance.

Robbins was appointed as Principal Private Secretary to the Prime Minister at 10 Downing Street in 2006, replacing Ivan Rogers for the last part of Tony Blair's administration and the start of Gordon Brown's. When Brown re-set the Prime Minister's Office organisation to be more like its pre-1997 form, Robbins briefly served as Director of the Office before leaving Number 10 in 2007 to become the Director of Intelligence and Security—later, Director of Intelligence, Security and Resilience—in the Cabinet Office.

In 2010, David Cameron's incoming administration reorganised the UK's national security apparatus, and Robbins's post was reformulated as the Deputy National Security Advisor responsible for intelligence, security and resilience. In this role, Robbins negotiated with The Guardian on how to curtail its reporting of material leaked by Edward Snowden relating to the operations of the CIA and GCHQ. The Guardian described Robbins as "steely but punctiliously polite".

In January 2014, Robbins was appointed Director-General, Civil Service at the Cabinet Office. In September 2015, Robbins moved to the Home Office as Second Permanent Secretary alongside Mark Sedwill. He had responsibility for immigration and free movement, as well as the borders, immigration and citizenship system. During this role, he was ordered to leave a meeting of the Home Affairs Select Committee after he was deemed to have given "unsatisfactory" answers about the budget for Border Force and to instead provide answers outside the hearing later the same day, which he did not do.

European Union adviser 
In July 2016, Robbins was appointed the head of the European and Global Issues Secretariat, advising the Prime Minister on the EU and to oversee Britain's exit from the European Union. Shortly thereafter, the secretariat was moved out of the Cabinet Office to become a full department, the Department for Exiting the European Union, of which he became the permanent secretary. In September 2017, Robbins moved from the Brexit department to become Prime Minister Theresa May's personal Brexit advisor. His closeness to May led to descriptions of him as her consigliere, though he has been praised by allies of the four Prime Ministers he served.

Robbins's role in negotiating a deal for the UK's withdrawal from the European Union led to some Conservative MPs blaming him for an anti-Brexit "establishment plot", criticising him as "secretive" and comparing him to Grigori Rasputin. Acting Cabinet Secretary Mark Sedwill sent a letter to The Times defending Robbins, highlighting that civil servants implement the decisions of elected governments. Sedwill pointed to the example of HMRC Permanent Secretary Jon Thompson receiving death threats after giving evidence to MPs about the costs of a potential post-Brexit customs plan. Responding to Sedwill's letter, Andrew Adonis said that civil servants should "start getting used to criticism", as they had the option to work on other policies. A group of former military and intelligence officials associated with pro-Brexit pressure group Veterans for Britain including the former head of the Secret Intelligence Service Richard Dearlove said Robbins had "serious questions of improper conduct to answer" over defence and security co-operation between the UK and the EU after Brexit. Former Department for Work and Pensions Permanent Secretary Leigh Lewis backed up Sedwill's letter, noting the "occupational hazard for senior civil servants to be held responsible for the political decisions of ministers", of which he considered the attacks on Robbins to be a blatant example in a particularly toxic environment.

Later career 
In June 2019 it was reported that Robbins intended to resign when Theresa May left office. He took up the Heywood Fellowship at the Blavatnik School of Government in September 2019, after which he joined Goldman Sachs as a managing director in the bank's investment banking division.

Personal life 
Robbins married Sherry Birkbeck in 2005, and has three children. He has been described as "one of the tallest men in the British establishment". He is a member of the National Liberal Club.

Honours 
In the 2015 Queen's Birthday Honours, Robbins was appointed a Companion of the Order of the Bath (CB) for public service. He was made a Knight Commander of the Order of St Michael and St George in the 2019 Prime Minister's Resignation Honours.

References

External links
 Profile of Oliver Robbins on BBC Radio 4
Olly Robbins | Financial Times

1975 births
Living people
Civil servants in HM Treasury
Knights Commander of the Order of St Michael and St George
Companions of the Order of the Bath
People educated at Colfe's School
Alumni of Hertford College, Oxford
Principal Private Secretaries to the Prime Minister
Advisors
Brexit